Strahan was a town in Mills County, Iowa.

History
Founded in the 1800s, Strahan's population was 21 in 1902, and 82 in 1925.

See also
Wabash Railroad

References

External links
 IAGenWeb.org
 GhostTowns.com

Mills County, Iowa